The ecclesiastical title of archpriest or archpresbyter belongs to certain priests with supervisory duties over a number of parishes. The term is most often used in Eastern Orthodoxy and the Eastern Catholic Churches and may be somewhat analogous to a monsignor, vicar forane or dean in the Latin Church, but in the Eastern churches an archpriest wears an additional vestment and, typically, a pectoral cross, and becomes an archpriest via a liturgical ceremony.

The term may be used in the Latin Catholic Church in certain historical titles and may replace in popular usage the title of vicar forane, otherwise often known as a dean.

Antiquity 
In ancient times, the archdeacon was the head of the deacons of a diocese, as is still the case in the Eastern Orthodox Church, while the archpriest was the chief of the presbyterate of the diocese, i.e. of the priests as a body. The latter's  duties included deputising for the bishop in spiritual matters when necessary.

Western Christianity

Latin Catholic Church 

In the western Church, by the Middle Ages, the use of the title had evolved and became assigned to the priest of the principal parish among several local parishes. This priest had general charge of worship in this archpresbyterate, and the parishioners of the smaller parishes had to attend Sunday Mass and hold baptisms at the principal parish while the subordinate parishes instead held daily mass and homilies.

By the time of the Council of Trent the office of archpriest was replaced by the office of vicar forane, also known in English as "dean". The first recorded use of this meaning of the title comes from St Charles Borromeo's reforms in his own diocese. Unlike vicars general and vicars episcopal, vicars forane are not prelates, which means they do not possess ordinary power. Their role is entirely supervisory, and they perform visitations for the bishop and report to the bishop or vicar general any problems in their territory.

Exceptionally, the pope on occasion raised a territory to the rank of archipresbyterate nullius, detached from any prelature, yet under a non-prelate, as happened in 1471 with the future abbacy (1583) and later (1828-1986) Diocese of Guastalla.

In 1598, during the persecution of Catholics in England, an archpriest was appointed by the Holy See as head of the Catholic Church in England. The archpriest had authority over all of the secular clergy in the country. The Archpriest Controversy was a dispute between Roman Catholics supporting and opposed to this structure. In 1623 the Apostolic Vicariate of England was established, headed by an apostolic vicar rather than an archpriest.

The title of archpriest has survived in Rome, in Malta and elsewhere, where it is now held by the rectors of the principal basilicas. However, the title is entirely honorary, reflecting the fact that these churches held archpriestly status in the past.

In Rome today, there are four archpriests, one for each of the four papal major basilicas; all of them are presently bishops :
 Archbasilica of Saint John Lateran
 Basilica of Saint Peter
 Basilica of Saint Mary Major
 Basilica of Saint Paul outside the Walls

The use of "archpriest" in the Latin Catholic Church  should not be confused with "protopriest", the senior Cardinal-Priest in the College of Cardinals.

According to the specific historical tradition, many churches throughout the world, other than basilicas, are under the authority of a priest who bears the title of archpriest. However, the title is mostly honorary and today, such an archpriest has no control over subordinate clergy other than that of a parish priest over junior clergy assigned to assist him in meeting pastoral needs.

In the  Latin Catholic Church, it was traditional in some localities for a priest to be assisted at his First Mass by another priest termed for the occasion the archpriest, who  functioned as the deacon otherwise does. This was not a permanent title but referred only to the particular occasion.

Church of England 
In the Church of England there is at least one archpriest, the Archpriest of Haccombe. The title is a survival of local  practice of Latin Catholic Church prior to the Reformation. It was first employed in AD 1315 and has been held ever since. It was confirmed by an order in council on 1 April 1913 under King George V. The title reflects the fact that the archpriest has the right to sit beside the bishop and acknowledges no authority below that of the Archbishop of Canterbury, although today it is more appropriate to go through the usual channels of the church's hierarchy. Haccombe is a village in Devon, near Newton Abbot, where the parish is combined with that of Stoke-in-Teignhead with Combe-in-Teignhead. There is an hereditary patron for the Church of St Blaise, Haccombe. The modern office most closely resembling that of archpriest is the role of rural dean (rural dioceses) or area dean (urban dioceses). Like the archpriest of old, these officers have supervisory duties, but not ordinary jurisdiction, and are entitled to carry out visitations of subordinate parishes when so commissioned. With this in mind, although the Archpriest of Haccombe holds a unique role in the Church of England, it is considered analogous with certain incumbencies which bear the title "Dean" regardless of whether or not their incumbent is the actual rural or area dean. One example of this historical oddity is the office of Dean of Bocking in Essex. The current Archpriest of St Blaise, Haccombe is the current incumbent, the Reverend Annie Church, the first female priest to hold this office in Haccombe.

Eastern Christianity 

Archpriest, also protopope (protopapas) or protopresbyter (protopresbyteros), is a clerical rank, a title of honor given to non-monastic priests and is conferred by a bishop with the laying on of hands and prayer. An archpriest typically wears an epigonation, a vestment originally worn only by bishops; however, details vary locally, and in some places being given the epigonation is an honor that typically precedes being made an archpriest and in other places, it is an honor that is given to only some archpriests. An archpriest also wears a pectoral cross both as part of his street clothes and when vested.
The ceremony for making an archpriest is analogous to other clerical promotions bestowed with cheirothesia: at the little entrance of the divine liturgy, the candidate is conducted to the ambo in the middle of the church where the bishop is at the time, and the bishop blesses him and says a prayer addressed to Christ asking to "... endue our brother (name) with Thy Grace, and adorn him with virtue to stand at the head of the Presbyters of Thy people, and make him to be a good example to them that are with him ..."

In the Russian tradition, protopresbyter is a higher rank than archpriest, as explained in a translation by the Orthodox Church in America:
Although entitled "for the making of a Protopresbyter" it is clear that what is now known as an "Archpriest" is what is usually meant. The rank of "Protopresbyter" as a distinction higher than "Archpriest" is a later addition. The same Order, naturally, is used for what is now called "Protopresbyter".

Other uses 
The Unitarian Church of Transylvania is divided into five Archpriestships as a form of territorial governance, virtual dioceses.

See also 

Archimandrite
Archpriest Controversy
Arnaud de Cervole, also known as "the Archpriest"
Archpriest of Hita
Protopope

Notes

References and sources
References

Sources
Cross, F. L., ed. (1957). Oxford Dictionary of the Christian Church. London: Oxford University Press; pp. 79–80

Further reading 
 Amanieu, A. (1935). "Archiprêtre", in: Dictionnaire de Droit Canonique. Coll. 1004–26. Includes good bibliography.

External links

Eastern Christian ecclesiastical offices
Ecclesiastical titles
Catholic ecclesiastical titles